Dragnea is a surname. Notable people with the surname include:

 Marin Dragnea (born 1956), Romanian footballer
 Liviu Dragnea (born 1962), Romanian engineer and politician

Romanian-language surnames